Veerangkuppam is a small village in Ambur Taluk, part of the Tirupattur District in the Indian State of Tamil Nadu. This village is surrounded by coconut tree farms, and the Palar river. The village's population is approximately 3000.

Schools in Veerangkuppam 
Aided middle school. 
M.J.R Matriculation School.

Villages in Vellore district